The New York University College of Arts & Science (CAS) is the primary liberal arts college of New York University (NYU). The school is located near Gould Plaza next to the Courant Institute of Mathematical Sciences and the Stern School of Business, adjoining Washington Square Park in Greenwich Village. As the oldest and largest college within NYU, the College of Arts & Science currently enrolls 7,660 undergraduate students (as of 2017). CAS enrolls the largest number of undergraduate students for a private liberal arts college in the United States; its size and complexity owe to NYU’s overall profile of enrolling the largest number of students in the country for a private, nonprofit, residential, and nonsectarian institution of higher education. The College of Arts & Science offers Bachelor of Arts (B.A.) and Bachelor of Science (B.S.) degrees. 

In the 2020 QS World University Rankings, NYU was ranked 1st in Philosophy, 10th in Mathematics, and 15th in English Language and Literature.

Admission to the College of Arts & Science is highly competitive with an acceptance rate of 7% for the class of 2026.

History
see: History of New York University
In 1914, Washington Square College was established, downtown, to serve commuter students.

Academics
The college provides an undergraduate liberal arts education through its Core Curriculum. Undergraduate students may select from 66 majors as well as a host of accelerated Bachelor's-Master's and pre-professional programs offered through 30 departments, many of which also offer courses at NYU's 13 study away sites. Additionally, students may select from over 60 minors offered within the College as well as 40 cross-school minors at other colleges within NYU.

Student life

Clubs and traditions 
The school also hosts multiple student organizations, including greek life, political, religious, ethnic, and music performance groups (often alongside the Tisch School of Arts).

The university also sponsors some traditions for undergraduates including Apple Fest, the Violet Ball, Strawberry Festival, and the semi-annual midnight breakfast where Student Affairs administrators serve free breakfast to students before finals.

Publications and journalism clubs 
The College of Arts and Science runs several student journalism clubs and publication with the Arthur L. Carter Journalism Institute, including Washington Square News, NYU Local, Washington Square Local, and the literary journals Washington Square Review and The Minetta Review. The university also associated (though not officially affiliated) with the campus comedy magazine, The Plague, which started to poke fun at popular culture as well as campus life and the idiosyncrasies of NYU in 1978.

The university also runs a radio station WNYU-FM 89.1, which broadcasts to the entire New York metropolitan area.

Secret societies 
Several undergraduate secret societies have existed at the College of Arts & Science. Starting in 1832, the Philomathean Society and the Eucleian Society were formed, making rivals of each other. When the Philomathean Society died out, its remnants formed the Andiron Club in 1904. The most selective and famous club on campus is the Red Dragon Society, founded in 1898, which continues to exist to this day. Many notable NYU alumni have been members of these secret societies, including Elmer Ellsworth Brown, Howard Cann, John Harvey Kellogg, Walter Reed, and Frederic Tuten. Edgar Allan Poe was an occasional guest at the Eucleian Society.

Notable alumni

Academics

 Edward J. Bloustein, B.A. 1948; former president of Rutgers University, New Brunswick, New Jersey
 Lionel Casson, B.A. 1934; classicist, archeologist, professor emeritus at New York University
 Howard Crosby, B.A. 1844; Presbyterian minister and NYU chancellor 1870–1881
 Richard Davidson, B.A. 1972; Professor of Psychology at University of Wisconsin–Madison
 Morris Janowitz, B.A. 1941; founder of military sociology, professor at University of Chicago
 Richard Joel, B.A. 1972; current president of Yeshiva University, New York City
 Joseph Keller, B.A. 1943; 1988 National Medal of Science recipient
 Paul Kurtz, B.A. 1948; Professor Emeritus of Philosophy at the State University of New York at Buffalo
 Ellen Langer, B.A. 1970; Professor of Psychology at Harvard University
 Peter D. Lax, B.A. 1947; mathematician, 2005 Abel Prize recipient, 1986 National Medal of Science recipient
 Sherwin B. Nuland, B.A. 1951; bioethicist, author of How We Die
 Martha Nussbaum, B.A. 1969; philosopher, professor at University of Chicago
 Leonard Peikoff, B.A. 1954; philosopher, leading advocate of Objectivism
 Howard Zinn, B.A. 1951; historian, author of A People's History of the United States

Arts, acting, and entertainment

 Milton Babbitt, B.A. 1935; composer, 1986 MacArthur Fellow
 Bob Balaban, B.A. 1977; actor
 Neil Diamond (Did not graduate); musician
 Tom Ford (Did not graduate); fashion designer and film director
 William Gaines, B.A. 1948; founder of MAD Magazine
 Ilana Glazer, B.A. 2009; co-star and co-creator of the Comedy Central series Broad City
 Ethan Hawke (Did not graduate); actor
 Tom Kirdahy, B.A. 1985; Theater producer and activist
 Stanley Kramer, B.A. 1933; film director
 Ken Leung, B.A. 1992; actor
 Dave Liebman, B.A. 1967; jazz musician
 Leonard Maltin, B.A. 1973; film critic
 Glen Mazzara, B.A. 1989; television producer
 Alan Menken, B.A. 1972; musical theater and film composer
 Valeria Mercer, B.A. 1979; Head Curator of African-American Art (Detroit Institute of Arts)
 Meg Ryan, B.A. 1982; actor

 Martin Scorsese, B.A; 1964; film director, 2006 recipient of Academy Award for Best Director

Authors and writers

 Warren Adler, B.A. 1947; author of The War of the Roses
 Caleb Carr, B.A. 1977; author

 Elizabeth Gilbert, B.A. 1991; author of Eat, Pray, Love
 Joseph Heller, B.A. 1948; author of Catch-22
 Ira Levin, B.A. 1950; author
 Frank McCourt, B.A. 1957; 1997 Pulitzer Prize for Biography or Autobiography recipient, author of Angela's Ashes
 Cynthia Ozick, B.A. 1930; author
 Kira Peikoff, B.A. 2007; author and journalist
 Charles Simic, B.A. 1967; 1984 MacArthur Fellow, Recipient of 1990 Pulitzer Prize for Poetry, 15th United States Poet Laureate

Business

 Maria Bartiromo, B.A. 1987; Fox Business Network television journalist
 Clive Davis, B.A. 1953; founder of Arista Records
 Marvin Davis, B.S. 1947; owner of Denver Broncos, billionaire, industrialist
 Jack Dorsey (Did not graduate); co-founder of Twitter and Square, Inc.
 Arthur Frommer, B.A. 1950; tourism industry writer
 Scott Harrison, B.A. 1998; founder and CEO of the non-profit charity: water
 Boris Jordan, B.A. 1988; billionaire, investor
 Henry Kaufman, B.A. 1948; president of Henry Kaufman & Company, Inc.
 Mildred Robbins Leet, B.A. 1942; entrepreneur and philanthropist
 Mark Leslie, B.A. 1966; venture capitalist and founder of Veritas Technologies
 Joseph Nacchio, B.S. 1970; former chairman and chief executive officer of Qwest Communications International
 Marc Rich (Did not graduate); commodities trader, billionaire, fugitive 
 Larry Silverstein, B.A. 1952; billionaire, real estate investor
 Sy Syms, B.A. 1946; founder of Syms Clothing
 Dennis Tito, B.A. 1962; entrepreneur, space tourist

Journalism

 Lynda Baquero, B.A. 1974; correspondent for WNBC
 Don Hewitt, B.A. 1941; television producer, creator of 60 Minutes
 Ray Suarez, B.A. 1985; broadcast journalist, host of Inside Story on Al Jazeera America
 Alvin Toffler, B.A. 1949; futurist, writer, journalist
 Gene Weingarten, B.A. 1973; Washington Post journalist, two-time Pulitzer Prize winner

Law
 Constance Baker Motley, B.A. 1940; civil rights activist, judge, state senator, Borough President of Manhattan
 Evan Chesler, B.A. 1970; partner and former chairman, Cravath, Swaine & Moore
 Jonathan Lippman, B.A. 1965; Chief Judge of the New York Court of Appeals
 Victor Marrero, B.A. 1963; United States federal senior judge
 Herbert Wachtell, B.S. 1952; co-founder of the law firm of Wachtell, Lipton, Rosen & Katz

Politics and government
 Jerome Anthony Ambro, B.A. 1955; US Congressman
 Bill de Blasio, B.A. 1984; 109th Mayor of New York City
 Irwin Delmore Davidson, B.S. 1927; US Congressman
 Thomas De Witt Talmage, B.A. 1853; preacher, religious leader, social reformer
 Steven Boghos Derounian, B.A. 1938; US Congressman
 William Henry Draper, Jr., B.A. 1916; first U.S. Permanent Representative to NATO
 Fernando Ferrer, B.A. 1972; former Bronx Borough president and 2005 Democratic nominee for Mayor of New York
 Henry Grunwald, B.A. 1944; U.S. ambassador; former managing editor of Time magazine and editor in chief of Time, Inc. 
 Sean Hannity (did not graduate); political commentator
 Frank L. Howley, B.S. 1925; brigadier general, commandant of the American sector of Berlin
 Jacob Javits, B.A. 1923; US Senator from New York from 1957 to 1981
 Samuel Levy, B.A. 1894; Manhattan Borough President
 Martha Roby, B.A. 1998; US Congresswoman
 Albert del Rosario, B.S. 1960; former Philippine ambassador to the US. Currently the Philippine Foreign Affairs Secretary

Science and technology:
 Balamurali Ambati, B.A. 1991; youngest person ever to become a physician
 Evelyn Berezin, B.S. 1951; computer engineer
 Eugene Braunwald, B.A. 1949; cardiologist
 Humayun Chaudhry, B.A., 1986; president and CEO, Federation of State Medical Boards
 Avery Fisher, B.S. 1929; inventor of the transistorized amplifier and the first stereo radio-phonograph, noted philanthropist
 Neil Garg, B.S. 2000; Professor of Chemistry at University of California, Los Angeles
 Chris Harrison, B.S. 2005; computer scientist and entrepreneur, assistant professor at Carnegie Mellon University
 Henry Sherwood Lawrence, B.A. 1938; immunologist
 Amit M. Shelat, B.A. 1997; Vice Chairman of the New York State Board for Medicine, New York State Education Department
 Alfred Vail, B.A. 1836; inventor
 Ari M. Wachsman, B.A. 2002; neurologist and neurointensivist, Assistant Professor at Case Western Reserve University School of Medicine
 George Wald, B.A. 1927; recipient of 1967 Nobel Prize in Physiology or Medicine

Sports

 Marv Albert, B.A. 1965; sportscaster
 Howard Cann, B.A. 1920; 1968 Naismith Basketball Hall of Fame Inductee
 Howard Cosell, B.A. 1938; sportscaster
 Carol Heiss, B.A. 1961; gold medal winner, Olympic Winter Games 1960
 Mika'il Sankofa, B.A. 1988; fencer, Olympic Gold Medalist
 Dolph Schayes, B.S. 1948, NBA champion (1955), 12× NBA All-Star, Hall of Fame Inductee
 Ed Smith, B.A. 1934; model for Heisman Trophy
 George Spitz, B.A. 1934; world record high jumper
 Colin Cassady, B.S.; WWE wrestler

References

External links
 
 Admission information
 Academics
 Research

1832 establishments in New York (state)
Educational institutions established in 1832
Liberal arts colleges at universities in the United States
Liberal arts colleges in New York City
Arts and Science
Science and technology in New York City